A list of Romanian jazz musicians  (sorted alphabetically by last name).

 B
Lucian Ban (piano)

 E
Teodora Enache (vocals) 
 
G
Radu Goldiş (guitar) 
Eugen Gondi (drums)
 K
János Kőrössy (piano)

 N
Florin Niculescu (violin)

 P
Anca Parghel (Vocals)
Marius Popp (piano)

 R
Johnny Răducanu (bass, piano)

 S
Cristian Soleanu (tenor sax, alto sax)

 T
Harry Tavitian (piano, vocals)
Mircea Tiberian (piano)

 U
Aura Urziceanu (Vocals)

 W
Peter Wertheimer (saxophone, clarinet, flute)

External links
-  List of Romanian Jazz Musicians at JazzWorldQuest

Lists of musicians by nationality
Lists of musicians by genre